Kathleen Ann Ridgewell-Williams (born May 18, 1965) is an American former soccer player who played as a forward, making three appearances for the United States women's national team.

Career
Ridgewell-Williams attended Enumclaw High School and Auburn Senior High School, where she played soccer. She attended college at Green River Community College for her freshman year. For her sophomore year, she transferred to Western Washington University, where she played soccer for the Vikings in 1985, finishing the season as the team's top scorer with thirteen goals while also registering four assists. She was selected as a NAIA First-Team All-American, and was also included in the NAIA All-District First Team. However, she decided to sit out the following season in order to focus on making the U.S. team at the Olympic Festival. She was also listed on the roster of the Colorado College Tigers from 1986 to 1987. For her senior year, Ridgewell-Williams played for the California Golden Bears in the 1987 season. There she was chosen as an NSCAA Third-Team All-American and was included in the NSCAA All-Region selection. In 2016, she was included in the Top 50 Women Players ranking by Washington Youth Soccer.

Ridgewell-Williams made her international debut for the United States in the team's inaugural match on August 18, 1985 at the Mundialito against Italy. In total, she made three appearances for the U.S., earning her final cap on July 11, 1987 in a friendly match against Norway.

Personal life
Ridgewell-Williams was born to Mary Martha and Earl Wallace Ridgewell, Sr. She married Timothy James Williams on August 7, 1993, in King County, Washington. She later worked as the director of a soccer club, as well as the general manager of an indoor training facility.

Career statistics

International

References

1965 births
Living people
Sportspeople from King County, Washington
Soccer players from Washington (state)
American women's soccer players
United States women's international soccer players
Women's association football forwards
Western Washington University alumni
California Golden Bears women's soccer players